Karabash is the name of several inhabited localities in Russia.

Modern localities
Urban localities
Karabash, Chelyabinsk Oblast, a town in Chelyabinsk Oblast; 
Karabash, Republic of Tatarstan, an urban-type settlement in Bugulminsky District of the Republic of Tatarstan

Rural localities
Karabash, Tyumen Oblast, a selo in Karabashsky Rural Okrug of Yalutorovsky District in Tyumen Oblast

Alternative names
Karabash, alternative name of Karabashevo, a selo in Karabashevsky Selsoviet of Ilishevsky District in the Republic of Bashkortostan;